Agh Bolagh (also Romanized as Āgh Bolāgh; also known as Āq Bolāgh) is a village in Shoja Rural District, in the Central District of Jolfa County, East Azerbaijan Province, Iran. At the 2006 census, its population was 83, in 25 families.

References 

Populated places in Jolfa County